Regimantas Miniotas (born 14 March 1996) is a Lithuanian basketball player for BC Wolves of the Lithuanian Basketball League (LKL).

Professional career
Miniotas started his professional career when he signed with BC Žalgiris-2 in 2014, after performance at Euroleague Youth Tournament. Averaging 16 points and 6.5 rebounds and 3.3 assists, Miniotas was selected to an All-Tournament Team. 

He played 2 seasons in Žalgiris-2 team in NKL, averaging 8 points and 5.5 rebounds. The most successful was second season, when team won NKL silver medals.

In the 2016–17 season, he signed with Vytautas Prienai-Birštonas.

On 28 November 2020, he signed with Bilbao Basket of the Liga ACB.

On November 18, 2021, he has signed with Žalgiris Kaunas of the Lithuanian Basketball League (LKL).

On July 10, 2022, he has signed with BC Wolves of the Lithuanian Basketball League.

References

1996 births
Living people
BC Nevėžis players
BC Prienai players
BC Wolves players
BC Žalgiris-2 players
Bilbao Basket players
Liga ACB players
Lithuanian expatriate basketball people in Spain
Lithuanian men's basketball players
Medalists at the 2017 Summer Universiade
Power forwards (basketball)
Sportspeople from Kėdainiai
Universiade gold medalists for Lithuania
Universiade medalists in basketball